ADO were a seminal Sino-foreign rock band, formed in Beijing in 1986. They are most remembered for collaborating with Cui Jian, a partnership that yielded Cui's first complete album, Rock 'n' Roll on the New Long March, in 1989. The album included "Nothing to My Name", the first rock anthem in China, and Cui's most famous song.

The band took their name from the Swahili word for "friend". ADO included two foreigners: bassist Kassai Balazs, a Hungarian student, and guitarist/vocalist Eddie Randriamampionona, a Madagascan embassy worker. The band began collaborating with Cui Jian in 1987, the same year the latter left the Beijing Symphony Orchestra. In the years to come, most of ADO's members were absorbed into Cui's own backing band, and continued to tour and release new music with him.

ADO's song "I Just Can't Say It Casually" was featured on the first China Fire compilation, released in June 1992. The band released its only album, I Just Can't Say It Casually, in 1996, and subsequently disbanded.

On December 23, 2014, Zhang Yongguang committed suicide.

Members 

 Zhang Yongguang (d. 2014) - drums
Liu Yuan - saxophone, woodwinds
 Eddie Randriamampionona - lead vocals, guitar
 Kassai Balazs - bass

References

Chinese rock music groups
Musical groups from Beijing